Diethylphosphite is the organophosphorus compound with the formula (C2H5O)2P(O)H.  It is a popular reagent for generating other organophosphorus compounds, exploiting the high reactivity of the P-H bond. Diethylphosphite is a colorless liquid. The molecule is tetrahedral.

Synthesis and properties
The compound was probably prepared in the 1850s by combining phosphorus trichloride and ethanol, but intentional preparations came later. It arises as follows: 
PCl3 + 3 C2H5OH → (C2H5O)2P(O)H + 2 HCl + C2H5Cl
Under similar conditions but in the presence of base, triethylphosphite results:
PCl3 + 3 EtOH + 3 R3N → P(OEt)3 + 3 R3NH + 3 Cl−

Many analogues of diethylphosphite can be prepared. Despite being named as a phosphite the compound exists overwhelmingly in its phosphonate form, a property it shares with its parent acid phosphorous acid. Nonetheless many of its reactions appear to proceed via the minor phosphorus(III) tautomer.

(C2H5O)2PIII(OH)  ⇌  (C2H5O)2PV(O)H, K = 15 x 106 (25°C, aqueous)

Reactions

Hydrolysis and alcoholysis
Diethylphosphite hydrolyzes to give phosphorous acid.  Hydrogen chloride accelerates this conversion.:

Diethylphosphite undergoes transesterification upon treating with an alcohol. For alcohols of high boiling points, the conversion can be driven by removal of ethanol:
(C2H5O)2P(O)H + 2 ROH → (RO)2P(O)H + 2 C2H5OH

Similarly amines can displace ethoxide:
(C2H5O)2P(O)H + RNH2 → (C2H5O)(RN(H)P(O)H + C2H5OH

P-alkylation
Diethylphosphite undergoes deprotonation with potassium tert-butoxide. This reactivity allows alkylation at phosphorus:
(C2H5O)2P(O)H + KOtBu → (C2H5O)2P(O)K + HOtBu
(C2H5O)2P(O)K + RBr → (C2H5O)2P(O)R + KBr
For converting aryl halides, palladium-catalysis can be employed. The C-P coupling process is reminiscent of the Buchwald-Hartwig amination.

Reaction of diethylphosphite with Grignard reagents results in initial deprotonation followed by displacement of the ethoxy groups. This reactivity provides a route to secondary phosphine oxides, such as dimethylphosphine oxide as shown in the following pair of idealized equations:
(C2H5O)2P(O)H + CH3MgBr → (C2H5O)2P(O)MgBr + CH4
(C2H5O)2P(O)MgBr + 2 CH3MgBr → (CH3)2P(O)MgBr + 2 MgBr(OC2H5)
(CH3)2P(O)MgBr + H2O → (CH3)2P(O)H + MgBr(OH)

Hydrophosphonylation
Diethylphosphite can add across unsaturated groups via a hydrophosphonylation reaction. For example, it adds to aldehydes in a manner similar to the Abramov reaction:

(C2H5O)2P(O)H + RCHO → (C2H5O)2P(O)CH(OH)R

It can also add to imines in the Pudovik reaction and Kabachnik–Fields reaction, in both cases forming aminophosphonates

See also
Dimethylphosphite
Diisopropylphosphite
Diphenylphosphite

References

Organophosphites